350pages is a web-based website construction tool which was launched in October 2007. It was created to enable non-technical users to create and publish web sites without the need for any design, authoring or technical skills.

It is unique in that it has 2 types of customizable templates, auto format and free format. It also differs from other website construction tools in that it includes customizable graphics, and the Premium and Platinum versions incorporate search engine marketing tools such as a search engine optimization report, website checkup audit and expert design guidance as well as a series of backups for offsite storage.

History
350pages was developed by ZyNet Ltd which was formed in the UK in 1994 as one of the first Internet Service Providers in the UK and an early adopter of entirely server-based solutions. ZyNet co-developed ZyWeb, launched in 1997, which was one of the world’s first web-based website builders.

350pages was created using Web 2.0 technologies which were not available when ZyWeb was developed.

Templates
350pages provides customizable templates and every object on the web page can be customized with borders, backgrounds, transparencies, orientation and they can be resized in real-time.

Web page objects include customizable graphics such as headings, navigation buttons, logos and dividers, rich text editor, photo editor, framed images, forms and e-commerce functions.

The auto-format automatically formats the web page content regardless of the size of web browser, and the free-format enables the user to drag and drop the page objects to any fixed position on the web page.

The websites created using the 350pages tools are industry standard HTML that is recognised by the search engines. 350pages integrates with social media such as Twitter and Facebook.

As everything on the web page is an object then 350pages enables third party objects to be placed on the page. Often known as Widgets or Gadgets these are tools that add extra functionality to the website.

There are five versions of 350pages - Free, Lite, Standard, Premium and Platinum.

Technical
350pages is a proprietary application, largely built on an open source foundation. The client-side code is written in JavaScript and makes use of Dojo Toolkit and the Trimpath JST template system, providing cross-browser support. The server-side code is written in perl built on the Catalyst framework. The application is delivered by an Apache HTTPweb server and runs on Debian virtual servers in the Flexiscale public cloud. Bitmap image processing is handled by the Image Magick library and the powerful, vector template based, smart graphics are managed using proprietary software provided by Xara. The system builds web pages from page templates which are constructed in standard HTML with mark-up extensions to control the editor and store extended meta-data.

External links
350pages Official Website
Website & Graphic Design

HTML editors
Web development software